Owasippe Scout Reservation (OSR), located in Twin Lake, Michigan is the resident camp operated by the Pathway to Adventure Council (formerly Chicago Area Council) of Boy Scouts of America. It is the United States' oldest and longest continuously operating Boy Scout camp.

Background
At its peak of use the reservation covered  and served over 10,000 Scouts per summer, but the overall decline in Scouting nationwide has seen yearly attendance fall to approximately 3,800 campers. The deal with the developer was terminated on November 7, 2008.

Owasippe Scout Reservation is composed of sub camps within the property. The current operating sub camps are Camp Blackhawk (Scouts BSA camp), Camp Wolverine (Scouts BSA and Cub Scouts), and Camp Reneker (Family Camp). There is also a high adventure base at Owasippe Scout Reservation.

The Owasippe Legend

Current Rendition 
Current rendition of the Owasippe Legend as listed by the Owasippe Staff Association. (Make note that the rendition used by Owasippe Scout Reservation in its ceremonies may differ in wording.)

“There are many legends regarding the lands, rivers and lakes of this area, but none more interesting than the legend surrounding the man whose name we have adopted for our camp. Owasippe was the great chief of the Potawatomie Indians who occupied this land in the early part of the 19th century. Legend compares his great wisdom with that of Solomon’s. The village over which the chief presided was on the flat at the foot of a hill near the Bishe-Gain-Dang (beautiful river in the Potawatomie language). The French trappers of the time knew the river as River Blanc. Today, we call it the White River.

The Bishe-Gain-Dang furnished the tribe with fresh water and a safe landing for their canoes. Both fishing and hunting were good and the wooded hills that surrounded them kept out the cold winter winds. They were also comparatively safe from attacks by hostile bands in the area.

Owasippe married late in life and when he became the father of two sons, he was overjoyed. As his sons grew, he taught them to find their way through the forest with the stars and the sun to guide them. He taught them to recognize the animals and the birds, the useful trees and plants, so that they might enjoy the full abundance around them.

Finally, the boys reached the age when they must prove their ability to become braves in the tribe. To earn this right, they had to undertake a great journey. They were required to spend several moons living in strange countries, surviving on what food they could find. If they could pass these tests with honor and courage, the tribe would officially recognize them as braves.

The boys loaded their canoes and set out. They followed the White River into White Lake and into the dangerous waters of Lake Michigan. They followed the shoreline south for many days and then turned north again until they came to a place called “Cheekahgaw,” which means “place of wild onions.” Today, we know that place as Chicago. To gain protection from hostile bands, the white men had built Fort Dearborn at the mouth of the river.

The sons of Owasippe stopped by Fort Dearborn and expressed friendly greeting in the name of their father. Here at Fort Dearborn, they remained for many days, making friends and trading with the settlers. Eventually, they knew it was time for them to return. Once again they set out on the perilous journey back to their beautiful valley.

When they failed to return after a reasonable length of time, Chief Owasippe became anxious. Every day, he would climb to the top of a high hill and sit for hours beneath a great pine tree, scanning the long marsh and watching for their reappearance on one of the many streams that wound through the tall grass. But they did not appear. Nor could he learn news of their whereabouts. They might have drowned in the treacherous river or met enemies who tortured and killed them. Whatever happened, the two boys were never seen again.

There he sat day after day. Several weeks passed, but he refused to leave. His fellow tribesman and closest advisors brought him food until finally he refused to eat. Eventually, Owasippe succumbed to uncertainty and disappointment. His people found him dead beneath the great pine. Owasippe’s people buried him in a sitting position on the spot where he died and covered his grave with a huge mound, as was worthy of a chief of his status.

In the early 1890s, three boys were following a trail near the mouth of Silver Creek when they noticed something that resembled the end of a canoe protruding from the bank. Hurrying back to town, they notified the village Marshall, who returned with the boys bringing men and shovels. They unearthed two dugouts, each containing the skeleton of a teenage Indian. They also found the metal parts of a flintlock rifle, bits of decayed blankets, a copper kettle and a silver ornament.

It was apparent from the evidence that these youth were the missing sons of Owasippe. The two boys had apparently pulled their canoes up along the high bank for the night, and the river, constantly cutting into the earth, had caused the bluff to cave in, burying them where they slept. The spot was less than a mile from where Owasippe had sat watching.

When the remains of Owasippe’s sons were found, the great pine by which Owasippe sat was still standing. By 1911, when Scouts began camping on these grounds, only a rotten log remained. Now, even that has disappeared. The mounds have been settled beyond recognition and the incredible legend of Chief Owasippe would have been lost except for the marker placed near his grave by the Boy Scouts of Chicago Area Council.

Many Indian names have sacred meanings, and efforts have been made to learn the correct meaning of the Chief’s name, but the Potawatomie language, being strictly oral, makes the matter difficult. Experts believe the name to be derived from the word “Awassisibi,” meaning “one who looks beyond the river.”

The courage and nobility displayed by the sons of Owasippe on their journey speak to the Scout virtues of Friendliness and Bravery, and their knowledge of the wilderness and ability to survive by their skills echoes the training of today’s modern Scout laws.

It is said that the spirits of Chief Owasippe and his two sons still walk the trails of the Reservation and join with the many Scouts who visit us each year. On quiet nights, when all is still, those spirits have been known to answer when called.”

Origins of the Owasippe Legend

1885 
“The Whitehall Forum” published the following story; “A week or two since some of the river boys saw the point of a canoe emerging from the ground on the banks of the river a little above cemetery point. They dug down at the spot, the rotten wood of the canoe crumbling away. Soon they found a knife, a gun barrel, and a silver shield upon which latter a number of Indian characters were engraved. They told of their find, and last Sunday Marshal McKenzie and a companion visited the spot and resumed the search. After digging through a layer of charcoal, the result probably of some ancient combustion, they came upon the bones of two skeletons, evidently of male and female adults. Removing the bones, they found a small copper kettle, a quiver shaft bound with two wide silver bands, upon which numerous characters and pictures were engraved, and a number of curious silver buckles. All were mildewed with age. Cloth in a very rotten state still adhered to the buckles and the cedar wood of the shaft was rotted away to where the silver bands encompassed it. Considering the charcoal deposit and other evidences, the relics must have been in the ground at least a century. The buckles were of a curious pattern, consisting of a round ring and a silver shaft passing through the cloth and overlapping the ring on each side. The relics are valuable mementoes and part of them may be seen in the window of Baker’s drug store. The boys have been offered various sums for them, but have not yet parted with these souvenirs of our Indian predecessors”

1898 
In 1898, Frederick Norman submitted a legend called "An Aboriginal Spot" for the book "White Lake Reminiscences." The legend he submitted is quite similar to the currently used legend of Owasippe. However, the name Owasippe is never used in writing until after the Boy Scout Camp is named. Frederick Norman’s daughter, Bernice Norman, later added that a Native American named John Stone recited the legend to her father. Bernice Norman claimed that her father did a good deed for John Stone during the civil war and Stone recited the legend for Frederick Norman in return.

“Along the banks of White Lake are many beautiful points that were once the abode of a prehistoric race whose existence is proved by the numerous relics they left behind, buried in the earth and which the plow or the shovel brings to the surface in the shape of arrow points, stone hatchets and bits of quaintly shaped pottery, ornamented in a way that is truly wonderful for a people who, taken as a whole, could have had but little opportunity or material for ornament. Sometimes a copper knife or string of beads is picked up where the cows have tramped their paths along the banks or side hills and the searcher after those relics is seldom disappointed if he looks closely for them One of the finest spots, as well as one of the most interesting, is Burying-Ground-Point, about three miles above the village of Whitehall. Just why it came to be called by that name, no one seemed to know as there was nothing there to indicate that it had ever been a place of burial for human beings. The numerous mounds that are found on the high grounds just back of and overlooking the places where the homes of these people were made, show plainly where their dead were buried. But nevertheless it was known to all, from the earliest settler down to the present time, as Burying-Ground-Point. Legends there were, as there always is, concerning such places and I will tell you one that was told to me by one of the aborigines who was a familiar figure in these parts at an early day. Near the mouth of Silver Creek which the Indians called Bishegaindang (the beautiful) stood a little village presided over and governed by an aged chief, who at the time of my story had two sons just grown to manhood. These boys were the pride of the old man’s heart for they were great in the chase, and excelled in the games that these primitive people knew: the bird in the highest tree was not safe from their arrows, while the finny tribe of the river and creeks paid tribute to their skills One morning in Autumn when the wood and marshland was all aglow with the red and gold of an Indian Summer, these young men, taking their canoes, started for the great water (Lake Michigan) and promised the old father that they would be back before the fog and shadows of night fell; a promise that was never to be fulfilled, for the shadows of night fell, and the days came and went, but the pride and life of the old chief’s heart never came. Leading straight up from the bank of Silver Creek was a high bluff from the top of which one could see for many miles, and every afternoon as the day was waning, the old man would climb to the top of the hill and seating himself under the huger pine that crowned the summit would gaze across the wood and marshland towards the open waters from whence his boys should come. But, alas, being doomed to continual disappointment and brooding over the uncertainty of their fate his life went out. His people found him dead under the tree where he had daily watched, and buried him where he died, his face still turned in the direction he had looked for their coming A few years ago some boys who were fishing at the point, noticed the partially decayed prow of a canoe projecting from the bank where the waters had undermined the soft sand and exposed it to view. Their curiosity was aroused and going down to the village told of their find. A party with shovels went to the Point and digging into the bank unearthed two canoes, each of them containing the skeleton of a man. A few simple implements and copper ornaments was all there were to tell that these were not the remains of white men. But the mystery of its name was now apparent, and it was plain what became of the old chief’s sons. They had undoubtedly got that far back from their trip when the shades of night and the thick fog settling over the marshland detained them from going farther, and so had pulled their canoes up under the projecting bank, making of them a bed for the night, and while asleep were caught by the treacherous bank caving over them. The mound at the top of the hill on Silver Creek near the ruins of the old mill, is still plainly visible. But the huge pine that stood close beside it, has fallen and lies decaying there. But enough of it and the old mound are still left to show their immense proportions”

1919 
“O-wa-sip-pe was one of the most beloved of old Chieftains, and many are the stories of his career. In one of their war expeditions, two young sons of Chief O-wa-sip-pe led the war party against their enemies, but the battle was against them and they never returned. The great loss grieved the old Chief so much that he died of a broken heart.”

1924 
“For a long time, the name ‘Deadman’s Rollway’ had been a mystery of the country. Not until 1887 was to even those who had spent all or nearly all of their life in this part the mystery solved to the entire satisfaction of those who made this part of the country their permanent home. As this time several young boys were spending the day fishing off of the point, which was a favorite fishing grounds, when they discovered the skeleton of a canoe. They returned to Whitehall, and reported their find to the people. A group of citizens, of which I was one, went up the river and after search found the skeletons of two canoes, and the skeletons of two men, along with a copper kettle, arrow heads, and beads. I had some of the beads and arrow heads until they were lost in the Whitehall Fire.”

Mr. Reed then went on to tell the story of Owasippe, and his two sons, “On this locality there lived and old Indian Chief, Owasippe IV or V, by name, who had two sons, the apple of his eye, and the favorites of the tribe. They were known as Big Bear and Little Bear, being named after the constellations in out heavens. Now as you probably know, it was the custom of the Indians to send their young men upon an ordeal when they reached the age of manhood. So Chief Owasippe called his tribe together for a farewell council fire. The sons danced for the people and the tribesmen in their turn, honored their young princes. The old Chief gave them good advice, and warned them of their dangers, whereupon the boys left for their journey down White River, into White Lake and into Lake Michigan. They were to return upon the second night.”

“On the afternoon of the second day, a dreadful storm broke forth, one of the most severe the country has ever known, and the sons did not return at the appointed time. The Chief became anxious. Every morning and evening, he went to the crest of the hill and watched the land of the setting sun. It became later, that he spent all of his time upon the lookout, and one day his people found him dead at his post under a pine, looking out over the country he had ruled.”

“The sons never returned, although the Chief has send out scouts and runners, and what became of them was never known until the people found the canoes at Burying Ground Point.”

“The supplement was that the sons were returning and were just off of the Point, when the storm overtook them. They landed and turning their canoes over for shelter, went to sleep underneath. During the night a landslide buried the princes, and they were never heard of until the river washed the sand from off their resting places. The Chief was buried at his Lookout, between two pines, as was the Indian custom.

Other Owasippe Legends

“The Indian Legend of White Lake the Beautiful” by John O. Reed 
This legend is about the author's father who settles in a wilderness area in Michigan and establishes a trading post. The man recalls an afternoon where he played near a spring with a young Native named Deerfoot and the old Sachem Owasippe. The old chieftain told the two boys a legend about a wise and good Sachem who ruled over all the Indians in the territory and was able to effect a peaceable settlement between two hostile tribes. When the old warrior passed away, his body was placed in a canoe and set adrift on a river, which eventually led to a lake. The Indians were startled to see the sky filled with white and silver winged birds, which they saw as the Great Manitou's white winged angels guiding the old chieftain to his final resting place. The canoe drifted to the shore near the old chieftain's wigwam, where the body was buried with great reverence, and the lake has since been known as "White Lake—The Beautiful."

External links
Pathway to Adventure Council, BSA
E. Urner Goodman Owasippe Museum
Owasippe Staff Association

References

Local council camps of the Boy Scouts of America
Buildings and structures in Muskegon County, Michigan
1911 establishments in Michigan
Summer camps in Michigan